Mmankgodi is a village in Kweneng District of Botswana. It is located 35 km from Gaborone and around 30 km from the border with South Africa. The population of Mmankgodi was 6,802 in 2011 census.

The people of Mmankgodi are called the Bahurutshe, a group also found in the village of Manyana. They arrived in the region from South Africa throughout the eighteenth century because of Boer oppression, which led to the Battle of Dimawe in 1852. The tribal chief of Mmankgodi is Kgosi, and, as is customary in Botswana, the salutation 'kgosi' is the title used before the chief's name.

References

Kweneng District
Villages in Botswana